The Fort Myers Power Plant is a natural gas and fuel oil-fired power station located in Lee County, Florida. The power station is composed of eight GE 7000F combined cycle natural gas-fired units (Blocks 2 and 3) and two fuel oil-fired units (Units 1 and 9), totalling an installed capacity of 2,608.9 MW. It is the third largest power station in Florida by installed capacity.

See also
List of largest power stations in the United States
List of power stations in Florida

References

Fossil fuel power stations in the United States
Power stations in Florida